Daniel Peter Simpson (born 4 January 1987) is an English professional footballer who last played as a right-back for Championship side Bristol City.

A product of the Manchester United academy, Simpson played on loan for Royal Antwerp, Sunderland, Ipswich Town, Blackburn Rovers and Newcastle United during his professional development. He then signed for Newcastle on a permanent basis in January 2010, before relocating to Queens Park Rangers on a free transfer in June 2013.

Simpson signed for Leicester City in 2014, then newly promoted to the Premier League. He was part of the Leicester squad that avoided relegation, in his first season, before winning the Premier League title in the 2015–16 season. He left Leicester for Huddersfield Town in 2019, but was released a year later.

Career

Manchester United
Simpson was born in Eccles, Greater Manchester, to a Jamaican father and English mother. Simpson played for Parkwyddn JFC in Eccles as a youth before being picked up by Manchester United. He is a product of the Manchester United youth system, having come up through the ranks into the reserve squad in 2005.

In early January 2006, he was sent on loan, along with three other United youths, to the Belgian Second Division club Royal Antwerp for the remainder of the season, to gain match experience. Simpson also spent the first half of the 2006–07 season at Antwerp before returning to United in January 2007.

On 25 January 2007, he joined Sunderland on loan for the rest of the season. The loan move saw him link up with fellow Manchester United player Jonny Evans. He won the Championship title with Sunderland that season. Simpson returned to United at the start of the 2007–08 season and signed a new contract in September 2007 that would keep him at the club until 2010. He made his first competitive appearance for United on 26 September 2007 in the 2–0 League Cup loss to Coventry City, and soon after made his Premier League debut on 6 October 2007 against Wigan Athletic at Old Trafford, coming on as a 30th-minute substitute for the injured John O'Shea. He set up the fourth goal with a well flighted cross for Wayne Rooney. The match ended with a 4–0 win to United. His European debut came on 23 October 2007, when he came on as an 80th-minute substitute for Ryan Giggs against Dynamo Kyiv. His first European start was in the reverse fixture against Dynamo Kyiv on 7 November 2007; United won the game 4–0.

On 21 March 2008, Simpson signed a loan deal with Ipswich Town. With Gary Neville on the verge of returning to the Manchester United first team, United manager Alex Ferguson decided it was best for Simpson to get as much first team football as possible, something that would be quite hard to come by at Old Trafford with both Gary Neville and Wes Brown ahead of Simpson in the pecking order.

On 4 August 2008, Simpson signed for Blackburn Rovers on a season-long loan deal. Simpson made his Blackburn debut on 27 August 2008, playing in Rovers' 4–1 win over Grimsby Town in the League Cup Second Round. His Premier League debut for Blackburn Rovers came almost three weeks later, on 13 September 2008, in a 4–0 defeat at home to Arsenal.
With the exception of Blackburn's League Cup Fifth Round defeat by Manchester United, which he was forced to miss because of a clause in his loan agreement, Simpson was ever-present for Blackburn during their League Cup and FA Cup campaigns. He also played in 11 out of the 14 league matches for which he was eligible prior to Christmas 2008, although he was named on the bench for the other three. After Christmas, Simpson only played in one further league match, another 4–0 defeat to Arsenal, and in early May 2009, with his first team opportunities limited at Blackburn, the loan agreement was terminated early and he returned to train with Manchester United.

Newcastle United

On 14 August 2009, Simpson joined Newcastle United on loan until January 2010, making his debut in a 1–0 victory over Sheffield Wednesday at St. James' Park. He scored his first goal for Newcastle against Peterborough United on 7 November 2009.

Following the completion of the loan deal, Newcastle made a bid to keep Simpson on a permanent basis. An undisclosed fee, reported as being in the region of £750,000, was agreed between Newcastle and Manchester United and Simpson signed a three-and-a-half-year contract on 20 January 2010.

He played a solid part in Newcastle's promotion to the Premier League, winning his second Championship title in the process, while forming a right flank partnership with January signing Wayne Routledge. Towards the end of the season, he "played through the pain" with what he considered a small ankle injury. He only realised the full extent of the ankle injury at the end of the season, and he had an operation to correct it. He was out for three months, including the first month or so of Newcastle's season. Simpson returned to action from his injury lay off, playing two reserve games in October. He made his first start of the new season in Newcastle's 2–1 victory over West Ham United, replacing James Perch at right back. Simpson kept his right-back spot with consistently strong performances, forming a strong partnership with Joey Barton on the right flank.

On 20 September 2011, Simpson scored a curler in Newcastle's 4–3 win over Championship side Nottingham Forest in the third round of the League Cup.

On 10 December 2011, Simpson started alongside James Perch at center back in place of the injured Steven Taylor and Fabricio Coloccini for Newcastle's 4–2 defeat at Norwich City. He had played at right back for the beginning of the season.

Queens Park Rangers
After his contract with Newcastle expired at the end of the 2012–13 season, Simpson signed a three-year deal with Championship club Queens Park Rangers on 27 June 2013. He scored his first goal for QPR in a League Cup tie against Exeter City on 6 August 2013. He made 36 Championship appearances for QPR as they earned promotion via the play-offs.

Leicester City

On 30 August 2014 signed a three-year contract for fellow promoted team Leicester City for an undisclosed fee. Simpson made his Leicester debut in a 2–0 defeat against Crystal Palace off the bench on 27 September 2014. However, he didn't make his second appearance for the club until 7 December against Aston Villa, as he often struggled to get into the side ahead of regular right back Ritchie De Laet. Simpson made 14 appearances overall for Leicester in the 2014–15 season.

In the 2015–16 season, under the new management of Claudio Ranieri, De Laet was again preferred ahead of Simpson to begin with. However, following a 5–2 defeat by Arsenal, Ranieri changed his full backs bringing Simpson in for De Laet helping to shore up Leicester's defence, as Simpson was considered a much more defensive full-back than De Laet and "rarely ventured forward". Leicester went on to win the 2015–16 Premier League title, and Simpson earned a winner's medal with 30 league appearances.

He was released by Leicester at the end of the 2018–19 season.

In February and March 2021, Simpson began playing with the Leicester City U23s squad in order to regain match fitness.

Huddersfield Town
After being released by Leicester, Simpson signed a deal until the end of the 2019–20 season with EFL Championship side Huddersfield Town.

Bristol City
On 26 March 2021, Simpson joined Bristol City on a deal until the end of the season. The move reunited him with former Leicester manager Nigel Pearson.

On 23 June 2021, it was announced Simpson had signed a new 1-year contract extension with the club. This was brought to an end early on 7 March 2022, when Simpson's contract was cancelled by mutual consent.

As a free agent
Simpson began making appearances as a TV pundit in the 2022–23 season. Despite this, he confirmed in a December 2022 interview, whilst launching a campaign to better support players' mental health at the end of their careers, that he was not yet retired, and was still training in the hope of finding a new club.

Personal life
Simpson has two daughters, Skye who was born six weeks prematurely in mid-2011 and Vienna born in 2020.

On 20 May 2015, Simpson was found guilty of assaulting his then-girlfriend and mother of his child, Stephanie Ward, on 28 December 2014. He was sentenced to 300 hours of community service. On 12 May 2016, his sentence was reviewed in light of press intrusion into his community service, and replaced with a 22:00 to 06:00 curfew for 21 days.

Career statistics

Honours
Sunderland
Football League Championship: 2006–07

Newcastle United
Football League Championship: 2009–10

Queens Park Rangers
Football League Championship play-offs: 2014

Leicester City
Premier League: 2015–16

References

External links

Danny Simpson profile at the official Huddersfield Town A.F.C. website

1987 births
Living people
People from Eccles, Greater Manchester
Footballers from Salford
English footballers
Association football defenders
Manchester United F.C. players
Royal Antwerp F.C. players
Sunderland A.F.C. players
Ipswich Town F.C. players
Blackburn Rovers F.C. players
Newcastle United F.C. players
Queens Park Rangers F.C. players
Leicester City F.C. players
Huddersfield Town A.F.C. players
Bristol City F.C. players
Challenger Pro League players
English Football League players
Premier League players
English expatriate footballers
Expatriate footballers in Belgium
English expatriate sportspeople in Belgium
Black British sportsmen
English people of Jamaican descent
English people convicted of assault
Sportspeople convicted of crimes